The Chehalis–Centralia Railroad (CHTX) is a heritage railroad based in Chehalis, Washington.

The railroad operated No. 15, a 2-8-2 steam locomotive built by 
Baldwin in 1916, over a 10-mile section of former Milwaukee Road track. The route was originally built by the Puget Sound & Willapa Harbor Railway in 1914 and winds through scenic hills, farmland, and over several wooden trestles over the Chehalis River, along with various tributary streams including the Newaukum River.

Operations were suspended indefinitely in 2022 due to insurance issues.

History
The railroad was incorporated as a non-profit organization in 1986 by Chehalis citizens inspired by a visit to Chehalis by the Mt. Rainier Scenic Railroad. The organization removed No. 15 from a city park where it had been on display for over 30 years, and brought it to the Mt. Rainier shops in Mineral, Washington, for restoration. Work on the locomotive was completed in 1989 and the railroad started operations later that year over ex-Milwaukee Road, Weyerhaeuser Timber Company-owned track. In 1993, the Port of Chehalis purchased the route. In 2006, there were 10,250 riders – a record for the railroad.

In December 2007, the railroad sustained significant flood damage, but with much work from the dedicated volunteers of the railroad the right-of-way has been completely restored, and trains can once again run all the way to Ruth.

In Early 2019, The #15 was found to have major boiler damage and could no longer be steamed safely. The locomotive has been out of service since. Repairs are expected to be completed by Q3 2021. However, this was hampered by severe washouts in February 2022.

Equipment Roster

See also

List of heritage railroads in the United States

Notes

External links

Heritage railroads in Washington (state)
Chehalis, Washington
Transportation in Lewis County, Washington
Museums in Lewis County, Washington